Claire Wilcox (born 1954) is senior curator of fashion at the Victoria and Albert Museum. She received an honorary doctorate in art and design from Middlesex University in July 2017. She sits on the editorial board of the journal Fashion Theory. She is professor of fashion curation at the London College of Fashion. She won the 2021 PEN/Ackerley Prize for Patch Work.

Curated exhibitions
Radical Fashion (2001)
Vivienne Westwood (2004)
The Golden Age of Couture: Paris and London 1947–1957 (2007)
From Club to Catwalk: London Fashion in the 1980s (2013)

Selected publications

Authored
A Century of Bags. Apple Press, 1998.
Modern Fashion in Detail. Victoria Albert Museum, London, 1998.
The Ambassador Magazine: Promoting Post-War British Textiles and Fashion. Victoria Albert Museum, London, 2012.
V&A Gallery of Fashion. Victoria Albert Museum, London, 2013.
Patch Work: A Life Amongst Clothes. Bloomsbury Publishing, London, 2020.

Edited catalogues
Radical Fashion (V&A, 2001)
Vivienne Westwood (V&A, 2004)
The Golden Age of Couture (V&A, 2007)
Alexander McQueen (V&A, 2015)

References 

Living people
1954 births
English curators
Academics of the University of the Arts London
People associated with the Victoria and Albert Museum
People educated at Godolphin and Latymer School
Alumni of the University of Exeter
Alumni of the University of the Arts London
British women curators